, , or  is the administrative centre of Karasjok Municipality in Troms og Finnmark county, Norway. The European route E06 highway runs through the village on its way from Lakselv to Tana bru and Kirkenes.

The village is an important centre in the municipality and region.  About 2/3 of the municipal population lives in the village.  The Sami Parliament of Norway is located in the village.  It acts as an institution of cultural autonomy for the indigenous Sami people in Norway.  The Old Karasjok Church and the newer Karasjok Church are located in the village.  The newer church is also the seat of the Indre Finnmark prosti (deanery) of the Church of Norway.

History
Prior to the beginning of the 1700s, there might not have been a permanent population there but the area was used by nomads.

World War II
During World War II a Nazi concentration camp was built in Karasjok: Lager IV Karasjok (German for "Karasjok Camp No.4"). The camp was run by SS, and it was among the first four Nazi concentration camps in Northern Norway.

In July 1943, 374 political prisoners and POWs prisoners (mostly Yugoslavs) were brought to the concentration camp. They were tasked with widening the road to Karigasniemi, Finland. After four or five months, only 111 of these prisoners were still alive. At the end of the prisoners' stay in Karasjok, before transportation out of Karasjok, 45 prisoners were massacred by the firing of small arms. At least one former prisoner is (as of 2013) still alive.

After World War II
In 2015, the second edition of Sápmi Pride, the LGBT pride festival, was held in Karasjok. To protest homosexuals attending the Karasjok Church, and to protest that a female priest held the services, Norges Samemisjon cancelled one of their radio broadcasts.

References

See also
Prison camps in North Norway during World War Two

Villages in Finnmark
Karasjok
Populated places of Arctic Norway